The Silver Shell for Best Actress (Spanish: Concha de Plata a la Mejor Interpretacion Femenina; Basque: Aktore onenaren Zilarrezko Maskorra) was one of the main awards presented at the San Sebastián International Film Festival to the Best Actress of a competing film. The last of this award was given out in 2020, after which it was replaced with a gender-neutral Silver Shell for Best Leading Performance and Silver Shell for Best Supporting Performance the following year.

Award winners

See also 

 Golden Shell for Best Film
 Silver Shell for Best Director
Silver Shell for Best Actor
Donostia Award
Sebastiane Award

References

External links 

Official website
SSIFF Award Archive
Film Affinity

San Sebastián International Film Festival
Spanish film awards
Lists of films by award
International film awards
Awards established in 1953